Marc Kudisch (born September 22, 1966) is an American stage actor, who is best known for his musical theatre roles on Broadway.

Early life and education
Kudisch was born in Hackensack, New Jersey, the son of Florence and Raymond Kudisch. His family is Jewish.  He grew up in Plantation, Florida. He enrolled at Florida Atlantic University to study political science and switched to theatre. After receiving his degree, Kudisch went to New York City and was cast as Conrad Birdie in the Barry Weissler-produced national tour of Bye Bye Birdie with Tommy Tune and Ann Reinking. Kudisch later starred in a television version of the Broadway musical along with Jason Alexander and Vanessa Williams.

Career
Kudisch's Broadway credits include Chitty Chitty Bang Bang (Baron Bomburst), Assassins (The Proprietor), Thoroughly Modern Millie (Trevor Graydon), Bells Are Ringing (Jeff Moss), Michael John LaChiusa's The Wild Party at the Public Theater (Jackie), The Scarlet Pimpernel (Chauvelin), High Society (George Kittredge), Disney's Beauty and the Beast (Gaston), and Andrew Lloyd Webber's Joseph and the Amazing Technicolor Dreamcoat (Reuben). He has been nominated for the Tony Award for Best Featured Actor in a Musical for his roles in 9 to 5 (2009), Chitty Chitty Bang Bang (2005) and Thoroughly Modern Millie (2002), as well as the Outer Critics Circle Award, and the Drama Desk Award.

Once more playing a villain, Kudisch starred in the Roundabout Theatre Company revival of The Apple Tree with his former fiancee, Kristin Chenoweth, as Eve and Brian D'Arcy James as Adam.

In late 2008, Kudisch joined Allison Janney, Megan Hilty and Stephanie J. Block in the new musical, 9 to 5. Based on the film of the same name, the production was directed by Joe Mantello and had its pre-broadway run at the Ahmanson Theatre in Los Angeles beginning September 21, 2008. The musical began preview performances on Broadway at the Marquis Theatre on April 7, 2009 with an official opening on April 30, 2009. Kudisch played sexist, egotistical boss Franklin Hart Jr., a part played by Dabney Coleman. Dolly Parton, who appeared in the original film, wrote the music and lyrics for the new musical.  The show closed on September 6, 2009.

He starred as Slick Follicle in the City Centers Encores! production of Girl Crazy, which ran Nov. 19 – 22, 
2009.

Kudisch appeared off-Broadway in the critically acclaimed improvisational comedy troupe Noo Yawk Tawk, as well as The Thing About Men, See What I Wanna See (Public Theater) and in the Lucille Lortel Award nominated The Glorious Ones. In 1987 he appeared in the murder mystery/party game Tamara: The Living Movie at New York City's Armory. He appeared in the Off-Broadway musical Minister's Wife. The show's music is by Josh Schmidt, lyrics by Jan Tranen, and a book by Austin Pendleton and it is based on Candida by George Bernard Shaw. He also performed in a one-man show beginning in July 2011 entitled What Makes Me Tick.

Kudisch has also appeared in Stephen Sondheim's A Little Night Music as Count Carl-Magnus Malcolm, opposite Juliet Stevenson and Jeremy Irons, in a 2003 production at the New York City Opera, and with Victor Garber and Judith Ivey in a 2004 staging by the Los Angeles Opera.  In regional theatre, he originated the role of Vincent van Gogh in The Highest Yellow, also by LaChiusa.  In June 2007, he starred as Darryl van Horne in the American premiere of The Witches of Eastwick at the Signature Theatre in Arlington, Virginia.

On television, in addition to a recent stint on All My Children, Kudisch played a kinky lawyer on Sex and the City and was also the spokesperson for Toyota in the U.S. for several years. He appeared on the hit NBC show Smash as Darryl Zanuck.

Personal life
In the early 90s, Kudisch became a baritone after working with a new vocal coach. Unlike many operatic singers, he trained in opera after college.

Kudisch and Kristin Chenoweth met when she moved to New York. They were engaged from 1998 to 2001. Kudisch began a relationship in 2003 with Broadway dancer and choreographer Shannon Lewis, with the couple marrying in 2011.  In 2016, the two mounted a production of Joseph and the Amazing Technicolor Dreamcoat for 3D Theatricals, with Marc directing and Shannon choreographing.

Credits
Theatre
 The Unsinkable Molly Brown as Johnny "Leadville" Brown (2017) - St. Louis Municipal Opera
 Finding Neverland as Charles Frohman/Captain Hook (2016) – Broadway
 Hand to God as Pastor Greg (2015) – Broadway
 The Wayside Motor Inn as Vince (2014) Signature Theatre Pershing
 Somewhere in Time as William Robinson - Portland Center Stage (2013)
 Hamlet (play) as Claudius/Ghost- Yale Rep (2013)
Tartuffe (play) as Tartuffe- Westport Playhouse (2012)
 9 to 5 as Franklin Hart, Jr. - Broadway (2009)
 The Glorious Ones as Flaminio Scala - Lincoln Center Theater (2007)
 The Witches of Eastwick as Darryl Van Horne - Signature Theatre (2007)
 The Pirates of Penzance as the Pirate King - New York City Opera (2007)
 The Apple Tree - Broadway (2007)
 Summer and Smoke - Hartford Stage (2006)
 Young Frankenstein as Inspector Kemp (2006)
 See What I Wanna See as Morito/Husband/CPA - Public Theater (2005)
 Chitty Chitty Bang Bang as Baron Bomburst - Broadway (2005)
 Assassins as The Proprietor - Broadway (2004)
 The Highest Yellow - Signature Theatre (2004)
 A Little Night Music - Los Angeles Opera (2004)
 Anna Karenina (2003)
 The Thing About Men (2003)
 A Little Night Music - New York City Opera (2003)
 Earth Girls Are Easy (2002)
 A Little Night Music  - Ravinia (2002)
 Thoroughly Modern Millie as Trevor Graydon - Broadway (2002)
 Bells are Ringing as Jeff - Broadway (2001)
 The Prince and the Pauper (2000–2001)
 "The Wild Party" - as Jackie (2000)
 The Scarlet Pimpernel as Chauvelin (1999)
 High Society - George Kittredge (1998)
 Beauty and the Beast as Gaston - Broadway (1995–1997)
 Joseph and the Amazing Technicolor Dreamcoat as Reuben (1993–1994)
 Bye Bye Birdie as Conrad Birdie - Tour (1990–1991)
Film
 Bye Bye Birdie as Conrad Birdie (1995)
Discography
 James and the Giant Peach World Premiere Cast
 9 to 5 2009 Original Cast
 The Glorious Ones 2007 Off-Broadway Original Cast
 See What I Wanna See 2005 Off-Broadway Original Cast
 Assassins 2004 Revival Cast
 The Man Who Would Be King 2004 Studio Cast
 The Thing About Men 2004 Original Off-Broadway Cast
  Anna Karenina 2003 Original Broadway Cast
 Thoroughly Modern Millie 2002 Original Cast
 "The Wild Party" as Jackie 2000 Original Cast
 Z: The Masked Musical 1998 Concept Cast
Television
 Smash as himself, playing Darryl F. Zanuck in Bombshell!
 The Tick as Agent Tyrannosaurus Rathbone
 Mindhunter as Roger Wade, a Fredericksburg elementary school principal.
 Billions as Dr. Gus, a therapist at Axe Capital.

Awards and nominations

References

External links

Marc Kudisch - Downstage Center interview at American Theatre Wing.org
Marc Kudisch: The Many Meanings of Temptation
Marc Kudisch at the Internet off-broadway Database
 -broadwayworld.com 

1966 births
Living people
American male musical theatre actors
Florida Atlantic University alumni
Actors from Hackensack, New Jersey
South Plantation High School alumni